Richard Owen Collinge (born 2 April 1946) is a former New Zealand cricketer, who played 35 Tests and 15 ODIs. He was New Zealand Cricket Almanack Player of the Year in 1971.

Domestic career
He played domestic cricket for three different sides. He made his first class debut for Central Districts in 1963/64 and played for them until 1969/70 before moving to Wellington from 1967/68 to 1974/75 and finally Northern Districts till 1977/78.  In 163 first class matches he took 524 wickets, with a best of 8-64, at an average of 24.41.

International career

A tall, strongly-built man, Collinge bowled left arm fast medium, ending his long run with both arms stretching upwards before delivering the ball. 
He pitched the ball up and relied on late movement. He was a good foil for the often wild express pace of the young Richard Hadlee and was instrumental in helping Hadlee bring New Zealand's first Test victory over England in 1977-8, with figures of 3-42 and 3-45. The fast inswinger with which he bowled Geoff Boycott at Wellington began England's collapse to 64 all out and brought the crowd to fever pitch.

He made his Test debut in 1965 and played his last match at Lord's in 1978.
 His best Test and One Day International bowling figures were both against India in 1975–76, with 6 for 63 and 5 for 23 respectively. At the time of his retirement, he was New Zealand's greatest wicket-taker, with 116 wickets at 29.25 each, despite missing many matches during his 13-year test career.

He could also be a useful batsman. At Auckland in 1972–73, Collinge scored 68 not out for New Zealand against Pakistan; this was the highest score ever made by a number 11 in a Test match at the time. That innings also formed part of the record last-wicket stand in Tests: 151 put on with Brian Hastings in 155 minutes.

Notes

External links
 

1946 births
Living people
Central Districts cricketers
New Zealand One Day International cricketers
New Zealand Test cricketers
New Zealand cricketers
Northern Districts cricketers
Wellington cricketers
Cricketers at the 1975 Cricket World Cup
North Island cricketers